Chukchansi (Chuk'chansi) is a dialect of Foothill and Valley Yokuts spoken in and around the Picayune Rancheria of Chukchansi Indians, in the San Joaquin Valley of California, by the Chukchansi band of Yokuts. As of 2011, there were eight native speakers.

Preservation efforts
In May 2012, the Linguistics Department of Fresno State University received a $1 million grant to compile a Chuckchansi dictionary and grammar texts, and to "provide support for scholarships, programs, and efforts to assemble native texts and create a curriculum for teaching the language so it can be brought back into social and ritual use." The five-year grant was provided by the Picayune Rancheria of the Chukchansi Indians from funds generated by the Chukchansi Gold Resort & Casino, and is expected to speed existing volunteer efforts by CSU Fresno faculty to document and teach the language. However, the grant has also been criticized in connection with recent disenrollments of Chuckchansi tribal members.

Recordings of the language were made by Sydney Lamb between 1953-1957. Efforts at documentation of Chukchansi have also been attempted using the Phraselator, a handheld recording device developed for military purposes. "When a person speaks into the device in English, it responds with the Chukchansi translation." However, as of 2007, these devices were too expensive to be widely distributed.

Chukchansi classes have been taught at the elementary school in Coarsegold, CA since 2008. As of 2012, Chukchansi classes are available for children and adults. The Native American Coffee Company's first coffee shop, which opened in Coarsegold in 2012, plans to translate the names of its coffee drinks into Chukchansi.

Preservation of the language has evoked strong feelings. Tribal Chairman Reggie Lewis emphasized the need to "preserve, protect, and revitalize our cultural identity and traditions." One tribal member, who put it more directly, said, "When [the United States] began the genocide of Native American communities, the reason they allowed us to sign our treaties was because we had a language ... Generations of our elders went through drought and atrocities; the core of our language is our identity," adding that she was encouraged by the fact that "non-native speakers in the community come to learn the language."

Phonology 
The following tables are based on Collord's 1968 grammar.

Consonants 

 sound is borrowed from other languages.  is generally high-tongued  after front vowels, and is slightly lowered elsewhere.

Vowels

References

Further reading

External links

Map showing traditional area of Chukchansi language
Chuckchansi Yokuts vocabulary, from Edward S. Curtis
Chuckchansi Yokuts audio recordings at the California Language Archive
Chuckchansi and Yokuts language at OLAC
Comparison of Chukchansi words with other Penutian dialects

Madera County, California
Native American language revitalization
Yokutsan languages